Nindo Shaher is a Union Council located in Badin Taluka, District Badin, Pakistan. Badin Taluka is an administrative subdivision of Badin District in the Sindh province of Pakistan. It is administratively subdivided into 12 Union Councils, three of which form the district capital Badin. Its history dates back to the period of Sama dynasty of Sindh. Towns in Nindo Shaher are Siyalki, Gujjo, Panhwerki, Dasti, Khakhar, Khalso, Murkha, Angri, Bhumbki.

Labor/Business

There are 6 main Rice Mills in Nindo Shaher that are Qazi Rice Mills, Jafferi Rice Mills, Ahmed Rice Mills, Khaskheli Rice Mill, Hyderi Rice Mills, Memon Rice Mills. There are also 15 small Mills. The ratio of business is more than labor in Nindo Shaher. The businesses are Kiryana, Tea hotels, cloth stores, carpenter, tailoring, barber, dry cleaner, iron smith, shoe maker, cabins & mechanics. Among all these, Kiryana is at the top with 140+ shops in the city.

Shrines
Shrines near the town include Shaheed Mard, Dadi Rahiman, Mansar and Noor Shah.

Myths
One myth regarding water and fruit trees is very famous. It is generally said that a curse by a woman belonging to Ahl al-Bayt (Dhadhi) made it so that no sweet water is available below ground and generally no fruit trees available inside the town boundary. More recently, after Consciousness among the people, they investigated the area and found that the area was surrounded by brackish water.

External links
Nindo Shaher

Populated places in Badin District